Albudeite is a municipality in the Region of Murcia, Spain.

Twin towns
 Saint-Geniès-de-Fontedit, France

References

External links
 

Municipalities in the Region of Murcia